Dr. Trimball's Verdict was a silent horror movie produced by Cecil Hepworth in 1913.

Plot 
A doctor kills his rival and dies of shock on seeing him materialise on a purchased skeleton.

Cast 

 Alec Worcester as Dr. Trimball
 Chrissie White as Alice

References

External links

1913 films
1913 horror films
British black-and-white films
British horror films
British silent films
1910s British films